Logie is a residential area of the City of Dundee, Scotland. It is located north of Blackness Road, bounded by Blackness Road, Balgay Road, Scott Street and Glenagnes Road.

Etymology 
The name Logie probably represents a Pictish or Gaelic toponymic element *login, "ecclesiastical site".

History
The Logie, or Lochee, estate belonged to several inter-marrying families, documented from at least 1660. These included the Wedderburn baronets. The mansion house was large, and was demolished in 1905.

Logie Housing Estate
The main feature of the area is the Logie housing estate, built between 1919 and 1920 and designed by James Thomson. The estate was the first public housing estate built in Scotland after the First World War ("Homes fit for heroes"). It was one of the first in Europe to have a district heating scheme, supplied by a boilerhouse that also provided a public wash-house for the surrounding area. Poor insulation of the supply pipes meant that the snow on the pavements melted.

The housing consists mostly of three-room (living room and two bedrooms, plus kitchen and bathroom) and two-room (living room and one bedroom, kitchen and bathroom) in blocks of four flats, two upper and two lower, each with its own front door of the type described in England as a "maisonette". As well as communal drying greens, the houses each have a small allotment, although many of these have now been grassed over. The district heating scheme was closed in the late 1970s and individual central heating installed in each house.

The estate is divided by a wide tree-lined dual carriageway, Logie Avenue, which was equipped with a view-point at its upper end next to Victoria Park. The estate was designated as an "outstanding" conservation area in 1991. The conservation area designation says of the houses that "the facades are enlivened by simple and effective brick detailing. The care taken over the detailing of the garden fences, gates, address plates, railings, steps and paths give the area a wonderful unity which is still intact today."

Logie School and Logie Poorhouse

Adjacent to the housing estate, on the corner of Blackness Road and Glenagnes Road, stood Logie secondary school, later Harris Academy Annexe, designed by C.G. Soutar and opened in 1928. This stood on the site of the Logie poorhouse of Liff & Benvie Parish, which was itself opened in April 1864. The school was destroyed by fire in 2001. A new combined site primary school is being built on the site in 2012. This will replace Park Place, and St Joseph's primaries.

Political representation
With the new Single Transferable Vote system in place, Bill Campbell (SNP), Richard McCready (Labour), Vari McDonald (SNP) and Fraser McPherson (Liberal Democrat) all represent the Logie area as part of the West End ward.

References

Dundee, An Illustrated Architectural Guide, A McKean & D. Walker, RIAS 1993  

Description of Conservation Area, Dundee City Council 2005

Areas of Dundee